Muravey is a rural locality (a settlement) in Zalesovsky Selsoviet, Zalesovsky District, Altai Krai, Russia. The population was 238 as of 2013. There are 5 streets.

Geography 
Muravey is located 16 km south of Zalesovo (the district's administrative centre) by road. Zalesovo is the nearest rural locality.

References 

Rural localities in Zalesovsky District